Biba was an iconic London fashion store of the 1960s and 1970s.

Biba or BIBA may also refer to:

Places
 Biba, Egypt, a city
 Biba Dhaka, a village in Pakistan
 Bakki Airport, Iceland (ICAO code)

People

Given name
 Biba Caggiano, Italian-American author, television chef and restaurateur
 Biba Golic (born 1977), Serbian table tennis player
 Biba Sakurai (born 1989), Japanese short track speed skater

Surname
 Andriy Biba (born 1937), Soviet football player and Ukrainian coach
 Bardhok Biba (1920–1949), Albanian communist politician
 Narinder Biba (1941–1991), Indian Punjabi singer

Other
 Biba Model, a formal state transition system of computer security policy
 Beijing International Bilingual Academy, a school in China
 Biba, a song by Marshmello, Pritam and Shirley Setia (2019)
BIBA, the British Insurance Brokers' Association, representative of insurance brokers in the UK
 Brought in by ambulance
Biba (restaurant)